The 1907 Boston Americans season was the seventh season for the professional baseball franchise that later became known as the Boston Red Sox. The Americans finished seventh in the American League (AL) with a record of 59 wins and 90 losses,  games behind the Detroit Tigers. Including spring training, the team had five different managers. The team played its home games at Huntington Avenue Grounds.

Pre-season 
 March: The team held spring training in Little Rock, Arkansas.
 March 28: During spring training, player-manager Chick Stahl died by suicide.

Regular season 
 April 11: The regular season opens with an 8–4 win in 14 innings over the Philadelphia Athletics at Columbia Park in Philadelphia.
 April 16: In the home opener, the Americans defeat the visiting Washington Senators, 4–2.
 April 20: George Huff takes over as manager, after Cy Young managed the team for the first six games of the season.
 April 24: The team releases Buck Freeman.
 May 1: Bob Unglaub becomes player-manager, taking over from George Huff.
 June 7: Third baseman and former manager Jimmy Collins is traded to the Philadelphia Athletics for John Knight.
 June 10: Deacon McGuire becomes manager, taking over from Bob Unglaub.
 July 15: In their longest game of the season, the Americans defeat the St. Louis Browns, 5–2 in 16 innings at Sportsman's Park in St. Louis.
 September 12: Future Hall of Famer Tris Speaker makes his major league debut in a road game against Philadelphia.
 October 3: After going winless since September 11, the team ends an 0–16–2 stretch with a 1–0 win over the visiting Browns.
 October 5: The regular season ends with a 3–3 tie in 11 innings against the New York Highlanders at Hilltop Park in New York City.

Statistical leaders 
The offense was led by Bob Unglaub (62 RBIs), Bunk Congalton (.286 batting average), and Hobe Ferris (four home runs). The pitching staff was led by Cy Young, who made 43 appearances (37 starts) and pitched 33 complete games with a 21–15 record and 1.99 ERA, while striking out 147 in  innings. No other pitcher had a winning record; Cy Morgan had a 6–6 record with 1.97 ERA in 16 games (13 starts).

Season standings 

The team had six games end in a tie; June 21 vs. Chicago, July 22 at Chicago, September 9 vs. Philadelphia, September 13 at Philadelphia, September 30 vs. Chicago, and October 5 at New York. Tie games are not counted in league standings, but player statistics during tie games are counted.

Record vs. opponents

Opening Day lineup 

Source:

Roster

Managerial records

Player stats

Batting

Starters by position 
Note: Pos = Position; G = Games played; AB = At bats; H = Hits; Avg. = Batting average; HR = Home runs; RBI = Runs batted in

Other batters 
Note: G = Games played; AB = At bats; H = Hits; Avg. = Batting average; HR = Home runs; RBI = Runs batted in

Pitching 
Note: G = Games pitched; IP = Innings pitched; W = Wins; L = Losses; ERA = Earned run average; SO = Strikeouts

Starting pitchers

Other pitchers 
Note: G = Games pitched; IP = Innings pitched; W = Wins; L = Losses; ERA = Earned run average; SO = Strikeouts

References

External links 
 1907 Boston Americans team page at Baseball Reference
 1907 Boston Americans season at baseball-almanac.com

Boston Red Sox seasons
Boston Americans
Boston Americans
1900s in Boston